Louis Georges Gustave de Caunes (26 April 1919 – 28 June 2004), professionally known as Georges de Caunes, was a well-known French television and radio presenter, journalist, writer and producer whose career spanned over six decades in French language television and radio.

Biography

Career
De Caunes joined broadcasting in 1945, shortly after the Second World War, there he translated Voice of America into French for the National broadcaster Radiodiffusion française. When television was launched in 1949, De Caunes became one of the first newsreaders on National TV, for which he co-anchored with Pierre Tchernia and Claude Dargat. He later went freelance and in 1953 was offered a full-time presenting job on TMC, following a success on Monacan television, De Caunes was later offered a radio presenting job on the newly formed station Europe 1. Between 1964 and 1966 he was head anchor for the evening news on O.R.T.F and by 1967 he had moved to Radio Luxembourg to front the morning show.

He made guest appearances in other television productions including a few episodes of Le Voyageur des siècles. He was also the French commentator at the Eurovision Song Contest in 1971, 1975 and 1977. He was also had a passion for theatre and in 1979 wrote a play entitled Comédie pour un meurtre. He was also a keen sports presenter fronting several football matches across the world for French television

Personal life
De Caunes was married three times. His first wife was the writer Benoîte Groult, they had two daughters Blandine (born 1946) and Lison (born 1950). He left Groult for television presenter Jacqueline Joubert from whom they had a son Antoine (who is now one of France's best known entertainers and the host of Eurotrash). In 1960 De Caunes divorced Joubert and in 1967 he married reporter Anne-Marie Carmentrez they had two children together Marie and Pierre (who is now a presenter).

De Caunes became a grandfather in 1977, when his son Antoine's wife gave birth to a girl: Emma de Caunes who is now a well-known actress in France.

He was awarded both National Order of Merit and the Legion of Honour by President François Mitterrand.

Death and tribute
Following a long time of illness, De Caunes died on 28 June 2004. Since his death, tributes rendered him, streets and avenues named after him.  Writers of adventure books receive the "literary Prix Georges de Caunes" as the book festival in La Rochelle.  Since 2005, the Festival Georges de Caunes, Human Adventure Sports and takes place in Vallauris (formerly Fidlas, International Film Festival and the Book of Sports Adventure).

References

External links
 Biographie de Georges DE CAUNES : journaldesfemmes.com

1919 births
2004 deaths
Mass media people from Toulouse
French male non-fiction writers
French radio presenters
French television journalists
French reporters and correspondents
French sports journalists
French radio journalists
French television presenters
20th-century French journalists
20th-century French male writers